Kourosh (also spelled as Koorosh or Kurosh) is a Persian male name common in Iran. Kourosh is composed of kouro- [sun] + -sh - [proprietorial suffix], meaning "Lord of the sun".

It was the throne name of Cyrus the Great and some other kings of the Achaemenid dynasty, historically translated into English and Latin as "Cyrus".

Etymology 
The name Cyrus is a Latinized form derived from the Greek Κῦρος, Kỹros, itself from the Old Persian Kūruš. The name and its meaning has been recorded in ancient inscriptions in different languages. The ancient Greek historians Ctesias and Plutarch noted that Cyrus was named from Kuros, the Sun, a concept which has been interpreted as meaning "like the Sun" (Khurvash) by noting its relation to the Persian noun for sun, khouro, while using -sh as a proprietorial suffix. This may also point to a  relationship to the mythological "first king" of Persia, Jamshid, whose name also incorporates the element "sun" ("shid").

Karl Hoffmann has suggested a translation based on the meaning of an Indo-European-root "to humiliate" and accordingly "Cyrus" means "humiliator of the enemy in verbal contest". In the Bible, he is known as Koresh.

People with the given named Kourosh 
Notable people with the name include:
Kourosh (Cyrus) the Great, Iranian King of Kings
Kourosh I (Cyrus I), Iranian King, Grandfather of Cyrus the Great
Kourosh (Cyrus) the Younger, Brother of Iranian King of Kings, Artaxerxes I of Persia
Kourosh Bagheri (born 1977), Iranian weightlifter
 Kourosh Kalantar-zadeh, Iranian-Australian scientist
 Koorosh Modaressi, Iranian politician
 Kourosh Zolani (born 1970), Iranian-American composer
 Kourosh Yaghmaei (born 1946), Iranian pop-rock musician

See also
Cyrus (name)
 Cyrus (disambiguation)
 Kouros (disambiguation)
 Koresh (disambiguation)

References

Persian masculine given names